Oreste is an Italian masculine given name. It is derived from the Orestes, who in Greek  mythology is the son of Clytemnestra and Agamemnon. People with the name Oreste include:

Oreste Albertini (1887–1953), Italian painter
Oreste Arpè (1889–1977), Italian wrestler, Olympic competitor
Oreste Barale (also known as Barale III)  (1904–1982), Italian footballer
Oreste Baratieri (1841–1901), Italian general and governor of Eritrea
Oreste Benatti (1909–??), Italian footballer 
Oreste Baldini (born 1962), Italian actor and voice dubbing artist
Oreste Benzi (1925–2007), Italian Catholic priest  
Oreste Biancoli (1897–1971), Italian screenwriter and film director
Oreste Bilancia (1881–1945), Italian actor
Oreste Candi (1865–1938), Italian luthier
Oreste Capuzzo (1908–1985), Italian gymnast and Olympic competitor
Oreste Casalini (1962–2020), Italian painter and sculptor
Oreste Cioni (1913–1968), Italian footballer
Oreste Conte (1919–1956), Italian racing cyclist 
Oreste Giorgi (1856–1924), Italian Cardinal of the Roman Catholic Church
Oreste Grossi (1912–2008), Italian rower and Olympic medal winner
Oreste Kirkop (1923–1998), Maltese opera singer
Oreste Lionello (1927–2009), Italian actor and voice dubbing artist
Oreste Marrero (born 1969), Puerto Rican baseball player 
Oreste Moricca (1891–1984), Italian fencer and Olympic medalist
Oreste Perri (born 1951), Italian sprint canoer, politician and Olympic competitor 
Oreste Piccioni (1915–2002), Italian-born American physicist 
Oreste Pinto (1889–1961), Dutch counterintelligence officer, Lieutenant colonel and author
Oreste Piro (born 1954), Argentinian-born Spanish dynamical systems theorist and biophysicist  
Oreste Puliti (1891–1958), Italian fencer and Olympic medalist
Oreste Ramos (Born ????), Puerto Rican politician 
Oreste Ravanello (1871–1938), Italian composer and organist
Oreste Recchione (1841–1904), Italian painter
Orestes Rodríguez (born 1989), Cuban sprinter and Olympic competitor
Oreste Riva (1860–1936), Italian composer
Oreste Rizzini (1940–2008), Italian actor and voice dubbing artist
Oreste Scalzone (born 1947), Italian Marxist intellectual and political activist
Oreste Silvestri (1858–1936), Italian painter
Oreste Sindici (1828–1904), Italian-born Colombian musician and composer
Oreste Squinobal (1943–2004), Italian mountain climber, mountain guide and ski mountaineer
Oreste Tescari (born c. 1923), Italian rugby player
Oreste Vaccari (1886–1980), Italian Orientalist and linguist
Oreste Zamor (1861–1915), Haitian politician, former President of Haiti

Italian masculine given names